= Mozcom =

Mosaic Communications
- Industry: Internet service provider
- Founded: 1994; 32 years ago
- Defunct: April 30, 2015
- Key people: Dr. Willy N. Gan and Dr. William T. Torres

Mosaic Communications, also known as Moscom, or as Mozcom, was the first commercial internet service provider in the Philippines, established in 1994.

On April 17, 2015, remaining Mozcom subscribers received notice that their accounts would be migrated to Tri-Isys Internet effective April 30, 2015 on account of the business closure of Mozcom.
